Jean-Louis Baribeau (March 19, 1893December 26, 1975) was a Canadian politician and a Member of the House of Commons.

Background
He was born on March 19, 1893, in Sainte-Geneviève-de-Batiscan, Mauricie, the son of Donat Baribeau and Joséphine Lacroix, and was educated in Sainte-Geneviève-de-Batiscan, at the Collège Sacré-Coeur in Victoriaville and at Griffin's Business College in Springfield, Massachusetts. Baribeau was a merchant. He was owner and president of Donat Baribeau & Fils Ltée, president of the Renardière de Sainte-Geneviève and a director of the Quebec retail merchants association. In 1923, he married Aimée Trudel.

Municipal politics
Baribeau was mayor of Sainte-Geneviève-de-Batiscan from 1929 to 1931, from 1937 to 1947 and from 1955 to 1957. He was also warden for Champlain County from 1936 to 1940.

Member of Parliament
Baribeau ran as a Conservative candidate in the federal district of Champlain in 1930 and won.

However, he was defeated by Liberal candidate Hervé-Edgar Brunelle in 1935.

Legislative Councillor
In 1938 he was appointed on the advice of Premier Maurice Duplessis to the Legislative Council of Quebec. He represented the division of Shawinigan and sat with the members of the Union Nationale.

Baribeau served as Speaker of the Legislative Council from 1950 to 1960 and from 1966 until the institution was abolished in 1968.

Death
He died in Trois-Rivières on December 26, 1975.

Footnotes

1893 births
1975 deaths
Conservative Party of Canada (1867–1942) MPs
Members of the House of Commons of Canada from Quebec
Union Nationale (Quebec) MLCs
Presidents of the Legislative Council of Quebec
Mayors of places in Quebec
People from Mauricie